The utriculosaccular duct (Latin: Ductus utriculosaccularis) is a part of the membranous labyrinth of the inner ear which connects the two parts of the vestibule, the utricle and the saccule.
The utriculosaccular duct continues to the endolymphatic duct and ends in the endolymphatic sac.

References 

Ear